Rosaura Lopez Lorenzo (16 March 1932, Pontevedra, Spain – 19 September 2005, Pontevedra, Spain) was a maid of John Lennon and Yoko Ono in the Dakota apartment between 1976 and 1980.

In 2005 she wrote a book in Spanish reflecting that period: En casa de John Lennon (At John Lennon's House), Hercules Ediciones, .
The book contains photos of John, Yoko and Sean along with some postcards that John and Yoko sent to her, and anecdotes such as:

Rosaura explains that she taught Lennon to bake bread.
One day she unblocked the WC due to a marijuana bag.
Lennon burned a coffee maker because he forgot to fill it with water
Yoko was very superstitious.
John gave Yoko carnations on her birthdays, the number of carnations corresponding to her age.
The couple slept on a bedstead supported on two church pews.
Rosaura spoke with Lennon's killer, Mark David Chapman, the day before his death in the Dakota entrance.

Rosaura arrived in Queens (New York) in 1962 with her husband Secundino and in 1974, she began working several jobs as a cleaner, one of them at the Dakota building, in the apartment next door to Lennon and Ono, who had previously shown interest in acquiring it for themselves.
The owners had a good relationship with their neighbours and, when they decided to move to London, they rented the apartment to John and Yoko on the condition that Rosaura would continue her work there, as they wanted to keep her as an employee when they eventually returned to New York.

External links
En casa de John Lennon Rosaura's book in the editor's web
At John Lennon’s House A detailed description of the e-book version

1932 births
2005 deaths
Spanish memoirists
Women memoirists
20th-century memoirists
John Lennon
Maids
20th-century Spanish women writers
Spanish women memoirists
People from Pontevedra